Apt.Core was the side project of Will Hunt, former drummer for many CCM artists such as Rebecca St. James, Shane and Shane, as well as others.

Style and influences
Apt.core's style was described as techno/trance.  Both albums took different sounds and moods and mixed them with different words, usually Biblical scripture.  Apt.core influences ranged from Middle Eastern to electronica to dance.

Discography

Rhythms Of Remembrance - 2001
Rocketown Records
 Creed
 The Way
 Meditate
 40
 Kingdom
 To Be With You
 E. 15
 Life Inverted
 Blessed
 Remain in Me

2 - 2003
Rocketown Records
 No Such Thing as Time
 A Tent for the Sun
 Loved
 Enjoy Breathing
 Mystery
 Worth More Than It Seems
 I Am A Temple
 19
 Light
 No End To You

References

American rock drummers
American trance music groups